Şenay Akay (born 16 August 1980) is a Turkish actress and former model.

Biography 
Akay was born in 1980 in Antalya. She is the niece of singer Müşerref Akay. She finished her studies at Akdeniz University. She started modelling at the age of 14. In 2001, she won both Best Model of Turkey and Best Model of the World competitions respectively.

In 2012, she wrote a book on 17 years of her life as a model. She still continues modelling at a number of fashion shows and appears on the podium occasionally. Akay was married to Buğra Özçetin for 1.5 year but divorced him in 2006 on the grounds of infidelity. In 2009, she started working as an image and appearance consultant.

Filmography

References

External links 
 

1980 births
Living people
Turkish television actresses
Turkish film actresses
Turkish female models
People from Antalya